Donato Zampini (10 December 1926 – 20 March 2007) was an Italian racing cyclist. He finished in fourth place in the 1952 Giro d'Italia.

Major results

1947
 2nd Coppa Agostoni
1950
 1st Overall Giro di Sicilia
 1st Stage 1 Giro dei Tre Mari
 4th Giro di Lombardia
 9th Milan–San Remo
1951
 1st Stage 5 Giro di Sicilia
 8th Overall Tour de Romandie
1952
 2nd Overall Paris–Nice
 4th Overall Giro d'Italia
 5th Giro del Lazio
 5th Giro del Ticino
 7th Overall Tour de Romandie
1953
 1st Giro del Ticino
 3rd Milano–Torino
 4th Giro dell'Emilia
 5th Overall Tour de Romandie
 7th Overall Volta a Catalunya
1st Stage 7
 7th Overall Tour de Suisse
 8th Giro di Lombardia
 9th Tre Valli Varesine
1954
 1st Stage 3 Tour de Suisse
 1st Stage 4 Euskal Bizikleta
 1st Stage 2 Vuelta a Asturias
 9th Giro dell'Appennino
1955
 4th Giro dell'Emilia
1958
 6th Tre Valli Varesine

References

External links
 

1926 births
2007 deaths
Italian male cyclists
People from Saronno
Tour de Suisse stage winners
Cyclists from the Province of Varese